"Piece of Me" is a 2007 song by Britney Spears.

Piece of Me, or A Piece of Me may also refer to:

 Britney: Piece of Me, a 2013-2017 concert residency by Britney Spears
 Piece of Me Tour, a 2018 concert tour by Britney Spears
 "Piece of Me" (MK and Becky Hill song), 2016
 A Piece of Me, a 2015 EP by Jacob Whitesides
 "A Piece of Me", a 2003 song by Luniz featuring Fat Joe

See also
 Pieces of Me (disambiguation)
 "Peace of Me", a song by Natasha Bedingfield from the album Unwritten, 2004